Igodo:The Land of the Living Dead is a 1999 Nigerian adventure film that was produced by Don Pedro Obaseki and directed Andy Amenechi.

Plot
The movie tells a story of a village that is troubled by evil spirits and sorcery. The only way to stop these evil spirits was for the men in the village to go to the evil forest to recover a sword with amazing powers to fight evil spirit and powers in the village.

Igodo joins this quest to the evil forest. He traveled there with a group and returned alone. Most of his colleagues were killed and hunted down by the spirits and monsters of the evil forest who prevent them from finding the sword of amazing powers.

Cast
Sam Dede
Pete Edochie 
Norbert Young
Charles Okafor
Prince James Uche
Ignis Ekwe
Obi Madubogwu 
Chidi Mokeme
Joe Layode

References

1999 films
Nigerian drama films
Igbo-language films
1990s English-language films
English-language Nigerian films